USS Cassia County (LST-527) was an  built for the United States Navy during World War II. Named for Cassia County, Idaho, she was the only U.S. Naval vessel to bear the name. USS Cassia County is recognized for service in World War II during the Invasion of Normandy, and in the Korean War.

Construction
In 1938, the Jeffersonville Boat and Machine Company was founded in Jeffersonville, Indiana, and later took over orders in a shipyard leased to the company by the US Navy in 1942. From this point, Jeffersonville Boat and Machine Co. became a supplier of Navy and military ships; particularly the Landing Ship Tank during World War II. LST-527 was laid down on 23 October 1943, meaning that construction on the ship's foundation officially began on this date. By 3 January 1944  LST-527 was launched, making her way to water.

Service history
During World War II, LST-527 was assigned to the European Theater and participated in the Invasion of Normandy from 6–25 June 1944. The role of tank landing ships was to drop off supplies, vehicles, and troops to shores without a docking site. LST-527 was decommissioned on 28 February 1945 as World War II neared its end.

As a result of hostilities in Korea, LST-527 was recommissioned on 21 September 1950. She participated in two campaigns during the Korean War; the Second Korean Winter on 11–12 January 1952 and 21–28 February 1952, and the Korean Summer-Fall on 7–17 May 1953, 29 May – 11 June 1953, 16–17 June 1953, and 27 July 1953. The vessel was renamed Cassia County (LST-527) on 1 July 1955.

She was decommissioned for the last time on 21 December 1956, and struck from the Naval Vessel Register on 1 October 1958. Cassia County earned one battle star for World War II service and two battle stars for Korean service. Cassia County was sunk as a target on 3 March 1959.

See also
 List of United States Navy LSTs

References

 
 
 Navy History and Heritage Command
 Jeffersonville Boat and Machine Company. shipbuildinghistory.com
 U.S.S. LST-527. hullnumber.com
 NavSource Online: Amphibious Photo Archive

LST-491-class tank landing ships
World War II amphibious warfare vessels of the United States
Korean War amphibious warfare vessels of the United States
Cold War amphibious warfare vessels of the United States
Cassia County, Idaho
Ships built in Jeffersonville, Indiana
1944 ships
Ships sunk as targets
Maritime incidents in 1959